Adam Hofman (born 23 May 1980) is a Polish public relations professional and a former politician. He was elected to the Sejm on 25 September 2005, getting 10,994 votes in 37 Konin district, running from the Law and Justice party list. He was the spokesperson for the Law and Justice party. He was expelled from this party for extorting public money for his private journey to Madrid. He later became involved in sports governing bodies, becoming the vice-president of the Poland Handball Federation.

On 10 November 2014 Hofman was dismissed from the Law and Justice party for the so-called "airplane affair".

See also
Members of Polish Sejm 2005–2007
Members of Polish Sejm 2007–2011

References

External links
Adam Hofman - parliamentary page - includes declarations of interest, voting record, and transcripts of speeches.

1980 births
Living people
Politicians from Kalisz
Members of the Polish Sejm 2005–2007
Law and Justice politicians
Members of the Polish Sejm 2007–2011
Members of the Polish Sejm 2011–2015